In classical antiquity, Greek and Roman writers were acquainted with people of every skin tone from very pale (associated with populations from Scythia) to very dark (associated with populations from sub-Saharan Africa (Aethiopia). People described with words meaning "black", or as Aethiopes, are occasionally mentioned throughout the Empire in surviving writings, and people with very dark skin tones and woolly hair are depicted in various artistic modes. Other words for people with other skin tones were also used.

Skin tones did not carry any social implications, and no social identity, either imposed or assumed, was associated with skin color. Although the color black was associated with ill-omens in the ancient Roman religion, racism as understood today developed only after the classical period:

"Aethiopes"

In classical antiquity, terms such as afer, maurus, niger, ater, fuscus, perustus, or melas were commonly used in reference to darker-toned physical characteristics encountered in daily life around the Mediterranean. The term Aethiopes ( Aethiops) referred to particularly dark-skinned peoples, first recorded as early as Homer, who presented them as remote, almost legendary figures that inhabited the far reaches of the known world. No ancient writer attempted the detailed human classifications of pseudoscientific racism, and no exact definition of the term Aethiops is recorded. Early contacts with such populations were along the Nile and with the civilization of the kingdoms of Nubia; the mythological stereotype of Aethiopia described its inhabitants as particularly moral.

Aethiopia

The earliest surviving mention is in the Odyssey: 

Extant geographical sources place Aethiopia somewhere within the upper part of the torrid zone in Sahara desert, imagined as engulfed by the Red Sea, and at the end of the world as known to classical antiquity. This territory merges into areas unknown to classical civilization at its edges, and Aethiopiae are at times described as antichthones, semi-mythic figures who lived beyond the edge of the known world.

Identifiable people

Aethiopiae were rare in the capital under Nero; it was evidence of a brilliant and costly affair when the gladiators for a whole day's show consisted only of Aethiopes.

One "Aethiop" soldier is reported (by an unreliable source) in Britannia in about 210 CE, his black skin being considered a bad omen for North African Emperor Septimius Severus who was born in Leptis Magna.

Depictions of skin tone
A strong distinction in skin color is frequently seen in the portrayal of men and women in Ancient Rome. Since women in Ancient Rome were traditionally expected to stay inside and out of the sun, they were usually quite pale; whereas men were expected to go outside and work in the sun, so they were usually deeply tanned. Separately, people with very dark skin and woolly hair were often depicted in art. Classical pedagogy, intermingled with the fraught legacy of racism, has incorrectly imputed racism to ancient depictions of people with the physical characteristics of sub-Saharan Africans.

Attitudes towards physical differences between populations
Romans and Greeks were generally ethnocentric, priding themselves on their autochthony and viewing themselves as somewhat privileged inhabitants of the optimal environment for human prosperity and advancement. Environmental determinism was the primary lens through which classical elites understood their perceived advantages vis-à-vis the "other", and ubiquitous themes of eastern effeminacy as compared to northern hardiness were ascribed to the consequences of different climatic conditions.

Classical authors have left no record of any social implications of dark or black skin color, but multiple sources of group identity are recorded. Romans clearly perceived physical differences between individuals and populations across time and space, as evidenced by the frequent representation of diverse types in classical iconography. But they never defined these differences in a comprehensive manner, employing a range of terms to describe human social and physical characteristics. For example, terms such as genos, ethnos, ethnê, and phulê can be approximately mapped onto 21st-century notions of race, ethnic grouping, political units, or other sociocultural concepts. A "Roman" identity did not suggest a given skin tone, rather it referred to an ever-shifting set of cultural traditions, growing more eclectic in later Roman history, to which inherited physical characteristics were of no relevance.

See also
Aethiopia
Romans in Sub-Saharan Africa
Curse of Ham
Washing the Ethiopian White

References 

Ancient Roman
Black (human racial classification)
Black people in literature